Neculai is a Romanian male given name and variant of Nicolae. It may refer to:

Neculai Munteanu (born 1941), Romanian anti-communist dissident
Neculai Onțanu (born 1949), Romanian politician
Neculai Păduraru (born 1946), Romanian sculptor and painter
Neculai Rățoi (1939–2016), Romanian politician
Neculai Alexandru Ursu (1926–2016), Romanian linguist, philologist and literary historian
Neculai Vasilcă (born 1955), Romanian handball player

Romanian masculine given names